Acacia synantha, also known as sandstone synchronous wattle,<ref name=lucid>{{cite web|last1=Maslin|first1=B.R.|last2=Barrett|first2=M.D.|last3=Barrett|first3=R.L.|url=https://apps.lucidcentral.org/wattle/text/entities/acacia_synantha.htm|title=Acacias of Australia – Acacia synantha|accessdate=7 April 2019|work= Wattle |publisher=Commonwealth Scientific and Industrial Research Organisation}}</ref> is a tree or shrub belonging to the genus Acacia and the subgenus Juliflorae''. It is native to a small area in the Kimberley region of Western Australia.

Description
It has angled to flattened brownish grey coloured branchlets that are resin ribbed. The dull green phyllodes become greyish with age. The simple inflorescences occur in groups of two to five are situated in the axils of new phyllodes.

Distribution

See also
List of Acacia species

References

synantha
Acacias of Western Australia
Plants described in 2013
Taxa named by Bruce Maslin
Taxa named by Russell Lindsay Barrett
Taxa named by Matthew David Barrett